Radoje (Cyrillic script: Радоје) is a masculine given name of Slavic origin. It may refer to:

Radoje Domanović (1873–1908), writer
Radoje Đerić (born 1991), rower
Radoje Knežević (1901–1981), politician
Radoje Kontić (born 1937), politician

See also
Radojević
Radojevo

Slavic masculine given names
Serbian masculine given names